Karl Grobben (27 August 1854, in Brno – 13 April 1945, in Salzburg) was an Austrian biologist. He graduated from, and later worked at, the University of Vienna, chiefly on molluscs and crustaceans. He was also the editor of a new edition of Carl Friedrich Wilhelm Claus' Lehrbuch der Zoologie, and the coiner of the terms protostome and deuterostome.

Taxonomy
Taxa named by Grobben include:
Eumalacostraca Grobben, 1892
Sagittidae Claus & Grobben, 1905
Sagittoidea Claus & Grobben, 1905
Protostomia Grobben, 1908
Deuterostomia Grobben, 1908

Taxa named in Grobben's honour include:
Gerbillus grobbeni Klaptocz, 1909
Sphaerophthalmus grobbeni Spandl, 1923
Limnadia grobbeni Daday, 1925
Actinia grobbeni Watzl, 1922
Paladilhiopsis grobbeni Kuscer, 1928
Raillietina grobbeni Böhm, 1925
Trypanophis grobbeni (Poche, 1904)

References

1854 births
1945 deaths
Austrian carcinologists
Austrian malacologists
Austrian biologists
University of Vienna alumni
Academic staff of the University of Vienna
Members of the Royal Society of Sciences in Uppsala